Woodlawn Park may refer to a place in the United States:

 Woodlawn Park, Kentucky
 Woodlawn Park, Oklahoma
 Woodlawn Park, the mansion of Judge Henry Hilton in Saratoga Springs, New York

See also
Woodlawn (disambiguation)